Phytoecia paulusi is a species of beetle in the family Cerambycidae. It was described by Holzschuh in 1971.

Subspecies
 Phytoecia paulusi paulusi Holzschuh, 1971
 Phytoecia paulusi bludanica (Sama, 2000)

References

Phytoecia
Beetles described in 1971